The 1983 West Dorset District Council election was held on Thursday 5 May 1983 to elect councillors to West Dorset District Council in England. It took place on the same day as other district council elections in the United Kingdom. The entire council was up for election, following boundary changes that reduced the number of wards by two, but altogether the number of seats remained the same. Subsequent elections for the council would be elected by thirds following the passing a resolution under section 7 (4) (b) of the Local Government Act 1972.

The 1983 election saw the Independent councillors lose seats but maintain their majority control on the Council.

Ward results

Beaminster

Bothenhampton

Bradford Abbas

Bradpole

Bridport North

Bridport South

Broadmayne

Broadwindsor

Burton Bradstock

Caundle Vale

Cerne Valley

Charminster

Charmouth

Chesil Bank

Chickerell

Dorchester East

Dorchester North

Dorchester South

Dorchester West

Frome Valley

Halstock

Holnest

Loders

Lyme Regis

Maiden Newton

Netherbury

Owermoigne

Piddle Valley

Puddletown

Queen Thorne

Sherborne East

Sherborne West

Symondsbury

Thorncombe

Tolpuddle

Whitchurch Canonicorum

Winterborne St Martin

Yetminster

References

West Dorset
1983
20th century in Dorset